This is a list of schools in Savai'i island, Samoa.

Education in Samoa is compulsory for children aged 5-years to 14-years or until the completion of Year 8. It consists mainly of public schools administered by the government and villages. There are 9 secondary schools and 48 primary schools in Savai'i.

Primary education - Year 1 - 8 (8-years)
Secondary education - Year 9 - 13 (5-years)

Secondary schools
Secondary schools and colleges on Savai'i island listed by the Samoa government's Ministry of Education, Sport and Culture.

Primary schools
There are 48 primary schools in Savai'i located in different school districts around the island.

School calendar

Terms

2010 School holidays
15 May - 6 June
4–19 September
11 December - 30 January

See also
Districts of Samoa
Samoan language

References

Savaii
Savaii
Schools in Savaii
Schools